The Back Peninsula (alternate names, Back Island, or Black Island) is a cape located on eastern Bell Peninsula, Southampton Island, in the Kivalliq Region, Nunavut, Canada. Its southern shore is part of the northern boundary of Hudson Bay. Foxe Basin is to the north. There are two large bays, Gorden Bay and Junction Bay. Bowhead whale frequent the area. The Bell Peninsula's irregular coastline is marked by Seashore Point and Expectation Point.

History 
The peninsula is named in honour of Arctic explorer, Sir George Back.

References 

 Back Peninsula, from the Atlas of Canada

Landforms of Hudson Bay
Peninsulas of Kivalliq Region